Johanna Lamberdina Maria "Joep" Baartmans-van den Boogaart (16 December 1939, Eindhoven – September 29, 2017) was a Dutch politician. She was a member of the Labour Party (pvdA).

She was a member of the municipal council of Boxmeer, a member of the States-Provincial as well as the States Deputed of the province of North Brabant, and also mayor ad int. of several municipalities in the province of North Brabant (Heusden, Schijndel, Son en Breugel, and Vught).

References

1939 births
2017 deaths
Dutch civil servants
Labour Party (Netherlands) politicians
Mayors in North Brabant
People from Vught
Members of the Provincial Council of North Brabant
Members of the Provincial-Executive of North Brabant
Municipal councillors of Boxmeer
People from Boxmeer
People from Eindhoven
Women mayors of places in the Netherlands